Bourtzwiller (Alsatian: Burtzwiller) is the most populated quarter of Mulhouse, France.

Mulhouse